, formerly , is a Japanese publisher  and division of Kadokawa Future Publishing founded on 30 January 1987 as . Magazines published by Enterbrain are generally focused on video games and computer entertainment as well as video game and strategy guides. In addition, the company publishes a small selection of anime artbooks. Enterbrain is based in Tokyo, Japan, with a paid-in capital of 410 million yen. Enterbrain's current president is Hirokazu Hamamura.

Enterbrain publications 
 B's LOG: Magazine focused on female gamers.
 TECH Win DVD: A magazine aimed specifically to PC users. It comes with two CD-ROMs worth of goodies and information.
 Tech Gian: A CD-ROM magazine focused on adult video games.
 Magi-Cu: A seinen visual entertainment manga magazine based on female game characters.
 Comic Beam: Comic Beam was formerly known as ASCII Comic. It is a seinen manga magazine filled with original manga.
 Harta (formerly Fellows!): A periodical seinen manga magazine consisting of original manga stories.
 Monthly Arcadia (月刊アーカディア): a 2000 monthly magazine focused on arcade game machines. It was started by former staff of (bi)monthly arcade game magazine Gamest (ゲーメスト) from 1986 which was published by Shinseisha, Ltd. Arcadia also has game hints and advice for the latest arcade games as well as high score reports from Japanese arcades.
 Sarabure: A horse racing magazine.
 Famitsu Connect!On: Magazine focused on online video games.
 Logout Tabletalk RPG Series: Tabletop role-playing games.

Enterbrain software 
 RPG Maker: a role-playing game creation tool
 Fighter Maker: a fighting games creation tool
 Sim RPG Maker: a tactical RPG games creation tool
 : a shoot-'em-up games creation tool
 IG Maker: creates platformer, adventure, and shoot-'em-up games. Also supports creation of games for the Xbox 360 console.

Tabletop role-playing games 
 Alshard
 Alshard GAIA
 Blade of Arcana
 : a Japanese superhero role-playing game set in modern Japan and includes elements of Japanese mythology such as yokais.
 Night Wizard!
 Star Legend
 Tenra War
 Terra the Gunslinger
 Tokyo NOVA

Video games 
 Panzer Front (1999)
 Tear Ring Saga (2001)
 Palette (2001)
 Galerians: Ash (2002)
 Berwick Saga (2005)
 KimiKiss (2006)
 The Magician's Academy (2007)
 Amagami (2009)
 Earth Seeker (2011)
 Photo Kano (2012)

 Light novels 
Enterbrain releases light novels under their Famitsu Bunko imprint, which was established in 1998 and is aimed at young adult males. They also publishes B's-LOG Bunko and B's-LOG Bunko Alice imprint focusing on girls and KCG Bunko focused on teens.

Enterbrain also publishes stand-alone series without any imprint such as Yōjo Senki or Overlord.

 Anime Busou Chuugakusei: Basket Army (2012) – short anime and audio drama. Busou Chuugakusei'' is the first venture in Enterbrain's XXolution project, a multimedia initiative that will span manga, novels, anime, illustrations, scripts, music, and other fields.

See also 
 ASCII Media Works
 Kadokawa Shoten

References 

 
Book publishing companies of Japan
Kadokawa Corporation subsidiaries
Role-playing game publishing companies
Magazine publishing companies of Japan
Publishing companies established in 1987
Japanese companies established in 1987
Comic book publishing companies of Japan